MŠK Fomat Martin is a Slovak football team, based in the town of Martin. The club was founded in 1994.

External links 
Official website 
Futbalnet profile

References

Football clubs in Slovakia
Association football clubs established in 1994
1994 establishments in Slovakia